Raul de Senna (born 17 June 1983) is a Brazilian equestrian. He competed in two events at the 2004 Summer Olympics.

References

1983 births
Living people
Brazilian male equestrians
Olympic equestrians of Brazil
Equestrians at the 2004 Summer Olympics
Pan American Games medalists in equestrian
Pan American Games bronze medalists for Brazil
Equestrians at the 2003 Pan American Games
Sportspeople from Belo Horizonte
Medalists at the 2003 Pan American Games
21st-century Brazilian people
20th-century Brazilian people